Broadcasting... is the third studio album by Canadian hardcore punk band Comeback Kid. The album was released on February 19, 2007.  It is the first album to feature Andrew Neufeld on lead vocals, following Scott Wade's departure.  The album peaked at #129 on the Billboard 200, #3 on Top Heatseekers, and #10 on Top Independent Albums. It was the last album on which Kevin Call played bass.

"Broadcasting.." was used on the NHL 2K8 soundtrack.

Track listing

The Japanese release of the album also include a music video for the song "Wake the Dead" from the band's previous album.

Critical reception
Matt Teutsch of Relevant Magazine said Broadcasting... continued Comeback Kid's previous sound on Turn It Around and Wake the Dead. Alternatively, Corey Apar of AllMusic said the album showed the band's strength after Wade left the band.

Chart positions

Personnel
Andrew Neufeld – vocals, guitar
Jeremy Hiebert – guitar
Kyle Profeta – drums
Kevin Call – bass

References

Comeback Kid albums
2007 albums
Victory Records albums
Albums produced by Bill Stevenson (musician)